Wang Xinyan (born 26 April 1991) is a Chinese water polo. 

She was part of the Chinese team at the  2015 World Aquatics Championships, and the 2016 Summer Olympics.

References

External links
http://www.todor66.com/Water_Polo/World_League/Women_Intercontinental_2015.html
https://swimswam.com/tag/wang-xin-yan/

Living people
Chinese female water polo players
1991 births
Asian Games medalists in water polo
Water polo players at the 2014 Asian Games
Water polo players at the 2016 Summer Olympics
Water polo players at the 2020 Summer Olympics
Olympic water polo players of China
Asian Games gold medalists for China
Medalists at the 2014 Asian Games
Sportspeople from Dalian
21st-century Chinese women